Misra and Gries defined the heavy-hitters problem
(though they did not introduce the term heavy-hitters) and described the first algorithm
for it in the paper Finding repeated elements.  Their algorithm
extends the Boyer-Moore majority finding algorithm
in a significant way. 

One version of the heavy-hitters problem is as follows: Given is a
bag  of  elements and an integer . Find the values that
The Misra-Gries algorithm solves
course of the algorithm.

Misra-Gries is one of the earliest streaming algorithms,
and it is described below in those terms in section #Summaries.

Misra–Gries algorithm
A bag is a like a set in which the same value may occur multiple
times. Assume that a bag is available as an array  of  elements.
In the abstract description of the algorithm, we treat 
and its segments also as bags. Henceforth, a heavy hitter of
bag  is a value that occurs more than  times in it, for some integer , .

From its definition, a -reduced bag contains fewer than  different values.
The following theorem is easy to prove:

Theorem 1.

The first pass of the heavy-hitters computation constructs a -reduced
bag .
According to Theorem 1, this
procedure determines all and only the heavy-hitters. The second pass
is easy to program, so we describe only the first pass.

specificity the following algorithm scans them in the order of
increasing indices. Invariant  of the
Initially, no value has been

Whenever element  is scanned, in order to preserve the
it and update  appropriately.
 
 algorithm Misra–Gries is
     1 = t, d := { }, 0;
     for i from 0 to n-1 do
         if b[i]  t then
             t, d:= t ∪ {b[i]}, d+1
         else 
             t, d:= t ∪ {b[i]}
         endif
         if d = k then
             Delete  distinct values from  update 
         endif
     endfor

) where each  is a distinct value in 
Then  is the size of this set. The
step "Delete  distinct values from " amounts to reducing each  by
1 and then removing any pair from the set if  becomes 0.

In order to assess the space requirement, assume that the elements of
 can have  possible values, so the storage of a value  needs
 bits. Since each counter  may have a value as high as
, its storage needs  bits. Therefore, for  value-counter pairs, 

Summaries
In the field of streaming algorithms, the output of the Misra-Gries algorithm in the first pass may be called a summary, and such summaries are used to solve the frequent elements problem in the data stream model. A streaming algorithm makes a small, bounded number of 
passes over a list of data items called a stream. It processes the elements using at most logarithmic amount of extra space in the size of the list to produce an answer. 

The term Misra–Gries summary appears to have been coined by Graham Cormode.

References

Streaming algorithms